A shtetl or shtetel ((singular); , romanized:  (plural)) is a Yiddish term for the small towns with predominantly Ashkenazi Jewish populations which existed in Eastern Europe before the Holocaust. The term is used in the contexts of peculiarities of former East European Jewish societies as islands within the surrounding non-Jewish populace, and bears certain socio-economic and cultural connotations.  Shtetls (or shtetels, shtetlach, shtetelach or shtetlekh) were mainly found in the areas that constituted the 19th-century Pale of Settlement in the Russian Empire as well as in Congress Poland, Austrian Galicia, Kingdom of Romania and in the Kingdom of Hungary.

For clarification, the expression "Jewish " was often used.

The shtetl as a phenomenon of Ashkenazi Jews in Eastern Europe was destroyed by the Nazis during the Holocaust.

Overview

A shtetl is defined by Yohanan Petrovsky-Shtern as "an East European market town in private possession of a Polish magnate, inhabited mostly but not exclusively by Jews" and from the 1790s onward and until 1915 shtetls were also "subject to Russian bureaucracy", as the Russian Empire had annexed the eastern part of Poland, and was administering the area where the settlement of Jews was permitted. The concept of shtetl culture describes the traditional way of life of East European Jews. Shtetls are portrayed as pious communities following Orthodox Judaism, socially stable and unchanging despite outside influence or attacks.

History
The history of the oldest Eastern European shtetls began around the 13th century and saw long periods of relative tolerance and prosperity as well as times of extreme poverty and hardships, including pogroms in the 19th-century Russian Empire.

The attitudes and thought habits characteristic of the learning tradition are as evident in the street and market place as the yeshiva. The popular picture of the Jew in Eastern Europe, held by Jew and Gentile alike, is true to the Talmudic tradition. The picture includes the tendency to examine, analyze and re-analyze, to seek meanings behind meanings and for implications and secondary consequences. It includes also a dependence on deductive logic as a basis for practical conclusions and actions.

In life, as in the Torah, it is assumed that everything has deeper and secondary meanings, which must be probed. All subjects have implications and ramifications. Moreover, the person who makes a statement must have a reason, and this too must be probed. Often a comment will evoke an answer to the assumed reason behind it or to the meaning believed to lie beneath it, or to the remote consequences to which it leads. The process that produces such a response—often with lightning speed—is a modest reproduction of the pilpul process.

The May Laws introduced by Tsar Alexander III of Russia in 1882 banned Jews from rural areas and towns of fewer than ten thousand people. In the 20th century revolutions, civil wars, industrialisation and the Holocaust destroyed traditional shtetl existence.

The decline of the shtetl started from about the 1840s. Contributing factors included poverty as a result of changes in economic climate (including industrialisation which hurt the traditional Jewish artisan and the movement of trade to the larger towns), repeated fires destroying the wooden homes, and overpopulation. Also, the anti-Semitism of the Russian Imperial administrators and the Polish landlords, and later, from the 1880s, pogroms, made life difficult for Jews in the shtetl. From the 1880s until 1915 up to 2 million Jews left Eastern Europe. At the time about three-quarters of its Jewish population lived in a shtetl. The Holocaust resulted in the total extermination of shtetls. It was not uncommon for the entire Jewish population of a shtetl to be rounded up and murdered in a nearby forest or taken to the various concentration camps. Some shtetl inhabitants did emigrate before and after the Holocaust, mostly to the United States, where some of the traditions were carried on. But, the shtetl as a phenomenon of Ashkenazi Jews in Eastern Europe was eradicated by the Nazis.

Modern usage

In the later part of the 20th century, Hasidic Jews founded new communities in the United States, such as Kiryas Joel and New Square, and they often use the term "shtetl" to refer to these enclaves in Yiddish, particularly those with village structures.

In Europe, the Ultra-Orthodox community in Antwerp, Belgium is widely described as the last shtetl, composed of about 12,000 people.

Qırmızı Qəsəbə, in Azerbaijan, thought to be the only 100% Jewish community not in Israel or the United States, has been described as a shtetl.

Culture

Not only did the Jews of the shtetls speak Yiddish, a language rarely spoken by outsiders, but they also had a unique rhetorical style, rooted in traditions of Talmudic learning:

In keeping with his own conception of contradictory reality, the man of the shtetl is noted both for volubility and for laconic, allusive speech. Both pictures are true, and both are characteristic of the yeshiva as well as the market places. When the scholar converses with his intellectual peers, incomplete sentences, a hint, a gesture, may replace a whole paragraph. The listener is expected to understand the full meaning on the basis of a word or even a sound... Such a conversation, prolonged and animated, may be as incomprehensible to the uninitiated as if the excited discussants were talking in tongues. The same verbal economy may be found in domestic or business circles.

Shtetls provided a strong sense of community due to Jews carrying faith in God. The shtetl "at its heart, it was a community of faith built upon a deeply rooted religious culture". A Jewish education was most paramount in shtetls. Men and boys would spend up to 10 hours a day dedicated to studying at yeshivas. Discouraged from extensive study, women would perform the necessary tasks of a household. In addition, shtetls offered communal institutions such as synagogues, ritual baths and ritual butchers.

This approach to good deeds finds its roots in Jewish religious views, summarised in Pirkei Avot by Shimon Hatzaddik's "three pillars":

On three things the world stands. On Torah, On service [of God], And on acts of human kindness.

Tzedaka (charity) is a key element of Jewish culture, both secular and religious, to this day. Tzedaka was essential for shtetl Jews, many of whom lived in poverty. Acts of philanthropy aided social institutions such as schools and orphanages. Jews viewed giving charity as an opportunity to do a good deed (mitzvah).

Material things were neither disdained nor extremely praised in the shtetl. Learning and education were the ultimate measures of worth in the eyes of the community, while money was secondary to status.
Menial labor was generally looked down upon as prost, or prole. Even the poorer classes in the shtetl tended to work in jobs that required the use of skills, such as shoe-making or tailoring of clothes.
The shtetl had a consistent work ethic which valued hard work and frowned upon laziness. Studying, of course, was considered the most valuable and hardest work of all. Learned yeshiva men who did not provide bread and relied on their wives for money were not frowned upon but praised as ideal Jews.

There is a belief found in historical and literary writings that the shtetl disintegrated before it was destroyed during World War II; however, Joshua Rosenberg of the Institute of East-European Jewish Affairs at Brandeis University argued that this alleged cultural break-up is never clearly defined. He argued that the whole Jewish life in Eastern Europe, not only in shtetls, "was in a state of permanent crisis, both political and economic, of social uncertainty and cultural conflicts". Rosenberg outlines a number of reasons for the image of "disintegrating shtetl" and other kinds of stereotyping. For one, it was an "anti-shtetl" propaganda of the zionist movement. Yiddish and Hebrew literature can only to a degree be considered representing the complete reality. It mostly focused on the elements that attract attention, rather than on an "average Jew". Also, in successful America, memories of shtetl, in addition to sufferings, were colored with nostalgia and sentimentalism.

Artistic depictions

Literary references
Chełm figures prominently in the Jewish humor as the legendary town of fools.

Kasrilevke, the setting of many of Sholem Aleichem's stories, and Anatevka, the setting of the musical Fiddler on the Roof (based on other stories of Sholem Aleichem) are other notable fictional shtetls.

Devorah Baron made aliyah to Ottoman Palestine in 1910 after a pogrom destroyed her shtetl near Minsk. But she continued writing about shtetl life long after she had arrived in Palestine.

Many of Joseph Roth's books are based on shtetls on the Eastern fringes of the Austro-Hungarian Empire and most notably on his hometown Brody.

Many of Isaac Bashevis Singer's short stories and novels are set in shtetls. Singer's mother was the daughter of the rabbi of Biłgoraj, a town in south-eastern Poland. As a child, Singer lived in Biłgoraj for periods with his family, and he wrote that life in the small town made a deep impression on him.

The 2002 novel Everything Is Illuminated, by Jonathan Safran Foer, tells a fictional story set in the Ukrainian shtetl Trachimbrod (Trochenbrod).

The 1992 children's book Something from Nothing, written and illustrated by Phoebe Gilman, is an adaptation of a traditional Jewish folk tale set in a fictional shtetl.

In 1996 the Frontline programme Shtetl broadcast; it was about Polish Christian and Jewish relations.

Harry Turtledove's 2011 short story "Shtetl Days", which can be read on-line, begins in a typical shtetl reminiscent of the works of Alecheim, Roth, et al., but soon reveals a plot twist which subverts the genre.

Painting
Many Jewish artists in Eastern Europe dedicated much of their artistic careers to depictions of the shtetl. These include Marc Chagall, Chaim Goldberg, and Mane Katz. Their contribution is in making a permanent record in color of the life that is described in literature—the klezmers, the weddings, the marketplaces and the religious aspects of the culture.

Photography
Alter Kacyzne (1885–1941), Jewish writer (Yiddish-language prose and poetry) and photographer; immortalised Jewish life in Poland in the 1920s and 1930s
Roman Vishniac (1897-1990), Russian-, later American-Jewish biologist and photographer; photographed traditional Jewish life in Eastern Europe in 1935-39

Film
The Dybbuk, 1937
Fiddler on the Roof, 1971
Yentl, 1983
Train of Life, 1998
An American Pickle, 2020
SHTTL, 2023 – an upcoming Yiddish-Ukrainian drama depicting the lives of a shtetl on the eve of Operation Barbarossa. A shtetl was build outside of Kyiv specifically for the film, and was set to become a historical museum. However, it is still unknown if the set survived the Russian invasion.

Documentaries
Shtetl, 1996
Return to My Shtetl Delatyn, 1992

See also
 Qırmızı Qəsəbə – the world's last surviving historical shtetl
History of the Jews in Bessarabia
History of the Jews in Carpathian Ruthenia
History of the Jews in Poland
History of the Jews in Russia and the Soviet Union
Jewish diaspora
List of Hasidic dynasties
List of shtetls and shtots
List of villages and towns depopulated of Jews during the Holocaust

References

Further reading

 Schumacher-Brunhes, Marie, Shtetl, EGO - European History Online, Mainz: Institute of European History, 2015, retrieved: March 8, 2021 (pdf).

External links

 Education/Newsletter/March 2017/Wikishtetl: Commemorating Jewish communities that perished in the Holocaust
 Boris Feldblyum Collection
 JewishGen
 The JewishGen Communities Database
 The JewishGen Gazetteer (formerly: JewishGen ShtetlSeeker)
 JewishGen KehilaLinks (formerly: ShtetLinks)
Galicia, Diaspora – Jewish Encyclopedia
Cities of Poland – Simon Wiesenthal Center Multimedia Learning Center Online
Virtual Shtetl
Jewish history of Radziłów
 Remembering Luboml: images of a Jewish Community
Towns in the Encyclopedia of Jewish Life
 Pre-1939 Kresy (now Ukraine) photo album
Jewish Web Index – Polish Shtetls 
The Lost Jewish Communities of Poland
History of the Jews in Poland
History of Berdychiv
Antopol Yizkor Book
The Journey to Trochenbrod and Lozisht August 2006
Shtetl gallery. 80 paintings by :fr:Ilex Beller. In German and Russian languages
Museum of the History of Polish Jews, Virtual Shtetl
Jewish guide and genealogy in Poland. History of Shtetl
Shoshana Eden, paintings of her shtetl
Shtetl, YIVO Encyclopedia of Jews in Eastern Europe

 Shtetls
Historic Jewish communities
Jewish communities
Jews and Judaism in Europe
 
Jewish Belarusian history
Jewish Ukrainian history
Types of towns
Yiddish words and phrases
Types of communities
Jewish enclaves